In fluid dynamics, total dynamic head (TDH) is the total equivalent height that a fluid is to be pumped, taking into account friction losses in the pipe.

 

 TDH = Static Height + Static Lift + Friction Loss + Velocity Head

where:
 Static height is the maximum height reached by the pipe after the pump (also known as the discharge head).
 Static lift is the height the water will rise before arriving at the pump (also known as the suction head).
 Friction loss (or head loss).
 Velocity head represents the energy of the fluid due to its bulk motion.
This equation can be derived from Bernoulli's Equation.

For a relatively incompressible fluid such as water, TDH is simply the pressure head difference between the inlet and outlet of the pump, if measured at the same elevation and with inlet and outlet of equal diameter.

TDH is also the work done by the pump per unit weight, per unit volume of fluid.

See also
 Hydraulic head
 Fluid dynamics

External links
 On-line TDH calculator - Pump World
 http://www.wolframalpha.com/input/?i=total+dynamic+head -wolframalpha.com

Fluid mechanics